Shigetada (written: 重忠 or 重格) is a masculine Japanese given name. Notable people with the name include:

 (1164–1205), Japanese samurai
 (1570–1626), Japanese daimyō
, Japanese mayor
 (1911-2006), Japanese scholar, spy, and lobbyist
 (born 1942), Japanese biochemist and neuroscientist

Japanese masculine given names